Asclepiad may refer to:
 A plant of the former family Asclepiadaceae
 Asclepiad (poetry), a type of metrical line used in lyric poetry
 Asclepiad (title), an ancient Greek title of uncertain profession, most likely a physician or healing priest
 The Asclepiad, a periodical published by Benjamin Ward Richardson, 1861, 1884–1895

See also 
 Asclepiades (disambiguation)